John Christopher Glazebrook Hodder-Williams (25 August 1926—15 May 1995) was an English musician, songwriter and author, mainly of science fiction. But he also wrote novels about aviation and espionage. He was the son of Ralph Hodder-Williams, who was one of the owners of the British publishing firm 'Hodder and Stoughton. Many of his books are early examples of what would later be called techno-thrillers. He also wrote teleplays and worked as a composer and lyricist.

Partial bibliography

Novels
The Cummings Report (1957) originally published as by James Brogan
Chain Reaction (1959)
Final Approach (1960)
Turbulence (1961)
The Higher They Fly (1963)
The Main Experiment (1964)
The Egg-Shaped Thing (1966)
Fistful of Digits (1968)
98.4 (1969) also published as Ninety-Eight Point Four
Panic O'Clock (1973)
Coward's Paradise (1974)
The Prayer Machine (1976)
The Silent Voice (1977)
The Thinktank That Leaked (1979)
Chromosome Game (1984)

Teleplays
For Armchair Theatre
The Ship That Couldn't Stop (1961) 
The Higher They Fly (1963)
A Voice in the Sky (1965) 

For the British television series Suspense
The White Hot Coal (1962)

References

External resources

Obituary: Christopher Hodder-Williams from The Independent, 22 May 1995

1926 births
1995 deaths
English fantasy writers
English science fiction writers
English short story writers
People educated at Sandroyd School
20th-century English novelists
20th-century British short story writers